C. N. Sreekantan Nair (1928–1976) was an Indian independence activist, a Malayalam writer, short story writer, playwright and screenwriter, best known for his Ramayana trilogy – Kanchana Sita, Saketham and Lankalakshmi. He wrote 10 plays, 4 short story anthologies, book of non-fiction and collected works. Kerala Sahitya Akademi awarded him their annual award for drama in 1962. He was also a recipient of the M. P. Paul Prize.

Biography 
C. N. Sreekantan Nair was born on March 31, 1928 at Thiruvananthapuram in the south Indian state of Kerala to Madavoor S.Neelakanta Pillai and Madhavikutty Amma. After schooling at local schools, he did his college education at Thiruvananthapuram during which time he was involved in student politics and served as the secretary of Akhila Thiruvithamcoor Vidyarthi Congress and as the vice president of the Akhilendhya Vidyarthi Congress. He participated in the Vidyarthi Congress of 1947 which was banned by C. P. Ramaswami Iyer, the then Diwan of Travancore, and he had to go into hiding. After the Indian independence, he completed his graduate studies and joined Prabhodham daily run by A. P. Udhayabhanu. Later, he worked in a number of publications, such as Navabharatham, Kaumudi, Tharapadham, Kathamalika and Deshabhandhu. He also worked as the district information officer of Department of Information and Public Relations, a job he quit, following a difference with R. Sankar, the then chief minister of Kerala.

Sreekantan Nair was married to Kanakangi Amma and the couple has two children.Towards the later part of his life, he turned spiritual and was involved in the running of a press, Sreemudralayam, in Kottayam which was later shifted to Ernakulam. He died on December 17, 1976, at the age of 48.

Legacy and honours 
Sreekanatan Nair, whose body of work comprises 10 plays, 4 short story anthologies and a book of non-fiction, is best known for his Ramayana-based trilogy, Saketham, Lankalakshmi and Kanchana Sita. Ayyappa Panicker, a noted poet and scholar, observed that Lankalakshmi brought out the playwright in Sreekantan Nair, while Saketham and Kanchana Sita highlighted the poet and the philosopher in the playwright. His first major play was Nashtakachavadam, which was a short story in the beginning but was later rewritten as a play in 1957 and Kali a play he wrote in 1967 is known as the first surrealist play in Malayalam literature. Nair, who experimented with stage direction and concepts of theatre, co-founded Nataka Kalari, a Kollam-based forum for the promotion and practice of theatre; several known writers and artists such as M. Govindan, Ayyappa Panikkar, G. Aravindan, Kainikkara Kumara Pillai and G. Sankara Pillai were involved with the movement. "Thanathunatakavedi", the idea of having a theatre involving indigenous art forms of Kerala was first evolved from C.N. He published an article "Thanathunatakavedi" in 1967 detailing his thoughts. He was the organiser of the 5th All India Writers Conference at Eloor, Kerala and The World Parliament of Religions in 1968 at Sasthamkotta, Kerala.

Sreekantan Nair's involvement with Malayalam cinema started with the 1966 film, Archana, directed by K. S. Sethumadhavan, and he wrote the story, screenplay and dialogues for the film. His next venture was for Kamuki, an Adoor Gopalakrishnan film, which was based on Nair's story but the film never released. Theerangal, a film by Rajeevnath in 1978 was based on his story and he wrote the dialogues for the movie and collaborated with the director on the screenplay. His play, Kanchana Sita was adapted into a film with same name by G. Aravindan and the film fetched the National Film Award for Best Direction for its director.

Sreekantan Nair received the Kerala Sahitya Akademi Award for Drama in 1962 for the play, Kanchana Sita. He was also a recipient of the M. P. Paul Prize, his play, Nashtakachavadam, fetching him the award.

Works

Plays 

 Saketham
 Lankalakshmi
 Kanchana Sita
 Nadakathrayam
 Aa kani thinnaruthu
 Aettile Pasu
 Kali
 Sneham Bhakti
 Nashtakachavadam
 Madhuvidhu
 Manyathayude mara

Short stories 

 Thilakkunna mannu
 Pichipoo
 Puliyilakkara neryathu
 Sindoora pottu

Essay 

 Randilayum oru thiriyum

Bibliography 

 
 
 
 
 
 
 
 
Nashtakkachavadam
Aa Kani Thinnaruth
Aettile Pashu
Madhuvidhu
Sindoorappottu
Thilakkunna Ponnu
Pichippoo
Puliyilakkara Neryath

See also 

 List of Malayalam-language authors by category
 List of Malayalam-language authors

References

Further reading
 
 
 Lankalakshmi – English Translation by Vasanthi Sankaranarayanan

External links
 
 
 

Indian male dramatists and playwrights
Writers from Kollam
Malayali people
Malayalam-language writers
Malayalam-language dramatists and playwrights
1928 births
1976 deaths
20th-century Indian dramatists and playwrights
Dramatists and playwrights from Kerala
20th-century Indian male writers
20th-century Indian short story writers
20th-century Indian non-fiction writers
Screenwriters from Kerala
Malayalam screenwriters
20th-century Indian screenwriters